The 2001 Arkansas State Indians football team represented Arkansas State University as a member of the Sun Belt Conference the 2001 NCAA Division I-A football season. Led Joe Hollis in his fifth and final season as head coach, the Indians compiled an overall record of 2–9 with a mark of 2–4 in conference play, placing in a three-way tie for fourth in the Sun Belt.

Schedule

References

Arkansas State
Arkansas State Red Wolves football seasons
Arkansas State Indians football